The Asa (Aasá) language, commonly rendered Aasax (also rendered as Aasá, Aasáx, Aramanik, Asak, Asax, Assa, Asá), was spoken by the Asa people of Tanzania. The language is extinct; ethnic Assa in northern Tanzania remember only a few words they overheard their elders use, and none ever used it themselves. Little is known of the language; what is recorded was probably Aasa lexical words used in a register of Maasai like the mixed language Mbugu.

Classification

Asa is usually classified as Cushitic, most closely related to Kw'adza.  However, it might have retained a non-Cushitic layer from an earlier language shift, and might be best left unclassified.

The Aramanik (Laramanik) people once spoke Asa, but shifted to Nandi (as opposed to Maasai).

Vocabulary
wataka - all
buʕurita - burn
dah - claw
ga - cloud
ki=te - die
wa-t- - dog
rakaš - dry
yatara - drink
haǯa-t - earth
ʔag- ~ ʔag-im- - eat
ila-t- - eye
ʔoreʔ-ek - far 
maʔa - water

Notes 

Petrollino, Sara & Maarten Mous, 2010, Recollecting Words and Expressions in Aasá, a Dead Language in Tanzania

External links
Aasax basic lexicon at the Global Lexicostatistical Database

South Cushitic languages
Languages of Tanzania
Unclassified languages of Africa
Mixed languages
Languages extinct in the 1950s
Dorobo